Aron Schmidhuber (born 28 February 1947 in Ottobrunn) is a retired football referee from Germany. He refereed two matches in the 1990 FIFA World Cup in Italy.

References

External links
 
 
 

1947 births
Living people
German football referees
UEFA Champions League referees
FIFA World Cup referees
1990 FIFA World Cup referees
UEFA Euro 1992 referees